In mathematics, an approximation to the identity refers to a sequence or net that converges to the identity in some algebra. Specifically, it can mean:
 Nascent delta function, most commonly
 Mollifier, more narrowly
 Approximate identity, more abstractly